The 49th Kerala State Film Awards, presented by the Kerala State Chalachitra Academy were announced by the Minister for Cultural Affairs, A. K. Balan in Thiruvananthapuram on 27 February 2019.

Writing category

Jury

Awards
All award recipients receive a cash prize, certificate and statuette.

Special Jury Mention
All recipients receive a certificate and statuette.

Film category

Jury

Awards
All award recipients receive a cash prize, certificate and statuette.

Special Jury Mention
All recipients receive a certificate and statuette.

References

External links 
 http://www.keralafilm.com

Kerala State Film Awards
2018 Indian film awards